César Luena López (born 29 October 1980) is a Spanish politician of the Spanish Socialist Workers' Party (PSOE) who has been serving as Member of the European Parliament since 2019. He was a member of the 9th, 10th, 11th and 12th terms of the Congress of Deputies in representation of La Rioja.

Early life and education 
Born in Logroño on 29 October 1980, A student in a rural school vis-à-vis his early education, he took his highschool education in Nájera. He earned a licentiate degree in Humanities at the University of La Rioja (UR) in 2003.

Political career

Early beginnings 
Luena joined the Socialist Youth at age 17 and the Spanish Socialist Workers' Party (PSOE) when he was 20 years old. 

After becoming Secretary General of the Socialist Youth of La Rioja region in 2002, Luena served as municipal councillor in Bobadilla from 2003 to 2007.

Luena ran 13th in the PSOE list for the 2007 regional election in La Rioja and, elected, he served as member of the regional legislature from 2007 to 2008. He was designated as head of the PSOE list in La Rioja to the Lower House for the 2008 general election, becoming a member of the 9th term of the Congress of Deputies. He renovated his seat for the 10th, 11th and 12th terms.

In 2012, Luena was elected as the Secretary General of the regional branch of PSOE, the PSOE La Rioja. In March 2014, he earned a PhD at the UR reading a dissertation titled Antonio Larrea: el alma del Rioja ("Antonio Larrea: The Soul of La Rioja"), supervised by José Luis Gómez Urdáñez.

Career in national politics 
After Pedro Sánchez became the PSOE leader in July 2014, the latter chose Luena as Secretary of Organization of the party. A member of Sánchez's inner circle during the later's first spell as party leader, he left the post after the political "defenestration" of Sánchez during the 2016 PSOE crisis in the Autumn of 2016 and the ensuing installation of an interim board; he was one of the sanchistas who distanced from their former leader, showing indifference towards Sánchez during the latter's intervention at the second investiture session of Mariano Rajoy as Prime Minister in October 2016.

Luena sided with Patxi López in regard of the May 2017 PSOE leadership election.

Member of the European Parliament, 2019–present 
Sánchez found a place for his former right-hand in the 11th slot of the PSOE electoral list for the May 2019 European Parliament election in Spain with Luena being finally included in the 10th place of the list after Sami Naïr (prospective #3) was barred from contesting the election by the Junta Electoral Central. Elected as MEP, 

In parliament, Luena is part of the Progressive Alliance of Socialists and Democrats (S&D) political group. He joined the Committee on the Environment, Public Health and Food Safety (ENVI). In this capacity, he was the parliament's rapporteur on the EU's strategy for biodiversity in 2021, calling for legally binding measures to halve the use of chemical pesticides, cut fertilizer use by 20% and expand protected areas of land and sea by 2030.

In addition to his committee assignments, Luena also became a member of the parliament's delegation for relations with the Korean Peninsula (DKOR), assuming a vice-chair role. He is also a member of the Spinelli Group.

References
Informational notes

Citations

Living people
MEPs for Spain 2019–2024
Spanish Socialist Workers' Party MEPs
Members of the 9th Congress of Deputies (Spain)
Members of the 10th Congress of Deputies (Spain)
Members of the 11th Congress of Deputies (Spain)
Members of the 12th Congress of Deputies (Spain)
Politicians from La Rioja
Spanish municipal councillors
Members of the 7th Parliament of La Rioja (Spain)
1980 births